The Susso is an Australian slang term referring to "sustenance" (welfare) payments, especially during the Great Depression. "Susso" could also be used as a noun, for someone depending on such payments, often unsympathetically.

Background

By late 1929, the Great Depression had hit all Western countries.

Causes 

The prices of wool and wheat — two of the nation’s biggest exports — had been in rapid decline. Overseas investments and loans started to disappear. As money became tight, there was a large decrease on spending on public work, which led to an increase in unemployment. 
The unemployment was further exacerbated by the falling income from primary producers. At the end of 1929, Australia's unemployment 
rate sat at around 13%. By 1932, it had peaked at a staggering 29%.

Effects 

Though the downturn in the economy had a much greater effect on the lives of the poor, not even the very rich could ignore the situation, as evidence of the Depression could be found everywhere. It was seen in the dole queues, soup kitchens doling out staple, filling foods, such as bread and potatoes, and shanty towns that sprang up across the nation. The Depression was illustrated by the estimated 40,000 homeless who had to create makeshift accommodation in public parks and fields and by the men that went wandering—"on the track"—in search of work during this time, or even food, known as swagmen. These men, estimated to be somewhere around 30,000 in number, had to report to a police station every week, where they could claim very basic rations of food.

The susso 

By 1932, more than 60,000 people depended on sustenance payments, known as "the susso", merely to survive. This was only for the truly destitute, who had been unemployed for a sustained period of time, and had no assets or savings. Relief was state-based; in South Australia, it was in the form of rations and vouchers. At a time when the basic wage was £2/11/8d, "the susso" in Queensland was 3s. to 4/6d per child. "Many spend more than that on a dog", one speaker was quoted as saying. Numerous campaigns took place around Australia in which community members carried out protests over inadequate levels of sustenance and the invasive and patronising treatment of recipients. In many cases these forced authorities to make improvements.

It was immortalised in a contemporary children’s rhyme (probably based on "You're in the Army Now", a World War I song featured in intertitles of the 1925 King Vidor silent film The Big Parade):
"We’re on the susso now,
We can’t afford a cow,
We live in a tent,
We pay no rent,
We’re on the susso now."

References

External links
 

Great Depression
Slang
Economic history of Australia
Social security in Australia